A Million Miles in a Thousand Years, subtitled "What I Learned While Editing My Life", is the sixth book by Donald Miller. After writing a successful book, author Donald Miller's life stalled. Instead of enjoying the fruits of his labor, Miller had slipped into a dark point in his life. He had no desire to participate in the daily responsibility of life and found himself questioning what his purpose was. While in this slump he was approached by two movie producers wanting to turn his book into a movie. A Million Miles in a Thousand Years centers on the realizations that Miller came to while editing his successful memoir Blue Like Jazz into a screenplay for a movie, directed by Steve Taylor.

In writing the screen play and editing the book events into proper and interesting movie dialogue, Miller learns a little more about the elements of story and through those things, learns more about the story that he is living as well as the story he wants to be living. He challenges himself by putting himself in situations that require more effort and sacrifice than he would typically feel comfortable exerting. Miller goes from sleeping all day to riding his bike across America, from living in romantic daydreams to fearful encounters with love, from wasting his money to founding a non-profit with a passionate cause. Guided by a host of outlandish but very real characters, Miller shows us how to get a second chance at life the first time around. A Million Miles in a Thousand Years is a rare celebration of the beauty of life.

Quotations 
“Somehow we realize that great stories are told in conflict, but we are unwilling to embrace the potential greatness of the story we are actually in. We think God is unjust, rather than a master storyteller.”

“If you aren’t telling a good story, nobody thinks you died too soon; they just think you died.”

“Good stories don’t happen by accident, I learned. They are planned.”

“...people don’t live without a story, without a role to play.”

“The ambitions we have will become the stories we live.”

“We have to force ourselves to create these scenes. We have to get up off the couch and turn the television off, we have to blow up the inner-tubes and head to the river.

“A good storyteller doesn’t just tell a better story, though. He invites other people into the story with him, giving them a better story too.”

“...one person’s story has the power to affect a million others.”

"Fear isn't only a guide to keep us safe; it's also a manipulative emotion that can trick us into living a boring life."

References 

 Miller, Donald. A Million Miles in a Thousand Years. Nashville: Thomas Nelson, 2009. Print

External links
 A Million Miles in a Thousand Years Tour

2009 non-fiction books
Thomas Nelson (publisher) books